Romanthony (born Anthony Wayne Moore; September 5, 1967 – May 7, 2013) was an American disc jockey, producer and singer. He is perhaps best known for his work with French duo Daft Punk, providing vocals for "One More Time" and "Too Long" from their Discovery album.

Early life, family and education 

Anthony Wayne Moore was  born on September 5, 1967, in New Jersey, United States.

Career 
His work crossed several genres, including house, R&B and hip hop. Tracks like "Hold On" make extensive use of sampling with a distinctly soulful house feel, while the later "Bring U Up" uses a James Brown–style breakbeat.

Most notably, he worked with Daft Punk on the song "One More Time", released in 2000. On November 7, 2012, he released his final musical contribution in the song "2Nite4U" with Kris Menace on his vocal collaboration album, Features.

Romanthony appeared on Black Male Records (his own label), Roulé, Dim Mak Records, Azuli, Play It Again Sam , Compuphonic and Glasgow Underground Recordings.

Death 

Romanthony died on May 7, 2013, at his home in Austin, Texas, due to complications from kidney disease, according to family members. He was 45 years old.

Discography

Albums 
 Romanworld (1997)
 Instinctual (1999)
 Live in the Mix (1999)
 R.Hide in Plain Site (2000)

Singles 
 "Now You Want Me" (Black Male Records 1991)
 "Falling from Grace" (Azuli Records 1993)
 "Make This Love Right / Now You Want Me" (Azuli Records 1993)
 "Testify #1" (Romanthony w/ The Trojan Horse) (Black Male Records 1993)
 "The Wanderer" (Black Male Records 1993)
 "Da' Change / Hold On" (Romanthony w/ The Trojan Horse) (Black Male Records 1994)
 "In the Mix (A Tribute to Tony Humphries)" (Azuli Records 1994)
 "Let Me Show You Love" (Azuli Records 1994)
 "Ministry of Love" (Azuli Records 1994)
 "The Wanderer" (Prescription 1994)
 "Bring U Up" (Romanthony w/ The Trojan Horse) (Black Male Records 1995)
 "The House of God" (Black Male Records 1995)
 "Trust" (Romanthony presents Lifestyles) (Downtown 161 1995)
 "Hold On" (Roulé 1999)
 "One More Time" (vocals for Daft Punk) (2000)
 "Too Long" (vocals for Daft Punk) (2000)
 "Never Fuck" (2002)
 "Curious" (2008)
 "Remember 2 4Get" (2009)
 "B 2 Nite" (2010)
 "Let's Go Back" by Kraak & Smaak featuring Romanthony (Solomun Remix) (2011)
 "Steppin' Out" by Tom Trago featuring Romanthony (2011)
 "Do It" (Teengirl Fantasy feat. Romanthony) (2012)
 "The Wanderer" (Romanthony vs. Kevin McKay) (2013)
 "2Nite4U" (Romanthony and Kris Menace) (2013)

References

External links 
 
 Romanthony at Discogs
 [ allmusic Overview]
 Obituary at The Guardian

American garage house musicians
American house musicians
African-American DJs
African-American male singers
American male singers
1967 births
2013 deaths
Daft Punk
Deaths from kidney disease